Calhounoceras is a genus of actinocerids (Cephalopoda, Nautiloidea) from the Lower Mississippian named by Troedsson, 1926.

References

 Calhounoceras, Fossilworks PaleoDB gateway.
 Jack Sepkoski, 2002 List of Cephalopod genera

Prehistoric nautiloid genera
Actinocerida